Xestia bolteri is a moth of the family Noctuidae. It is known from North America, including Arizona, New Mexico, Utah and Colorado.

The wingspan is about 35 mm.

References

Xestia
Moths of North America